Manuel Vidella (born c. 1920) was a Chilean boxer. He competed in the men's featherweight event at the 1948 Summer Olympics. At the 1948 Summer Olympics, he defeated Michel Ghaoui of Lebanon before losing to Francisco Núñez of Argentina.

References

External links
 

Year of birth uncertain
Possibly living people
Chilean male boxers
Olympic boxers of Chile
Boxers at the 1948 Summer Olympics
Place of birth missing
Featherweight boxers
20th-century Chilean people